is a Japanese professional shogi player ranked 5-dan.

Early life, education and amateur shogi
Tanaka was born in Nagano, Nagano on March 14, 1985. He became interested in shogi as a fourth-grade elementary school student after watching some friends play and asked his father to teach him the rules. Shortly thereafter, he started frequenting a local shogi club to improve his skill. 

As a first-grade junior high school student in 1997, Tanaka finished third in the 18th . In September of the following year, he entered the Japan Shogi Association's apprentice school as a student of shogi professional  at the rank of 6-kyū. He obtained full professional status and the rank of 4-dan in April 2008 after finishing tied with Akira Inaba in the 42nd 3-dan League (October 2007March 2008)with a record of 13 wins and 5 loses.

Tanaka graduated from the Science Department of Rikkyo University with a degree in mathematics in 2007.

Promotion history
The promotion history for Tanaka is as follows:

 6-kyū: September 1998
 4-dan: April 1, 2008
 5-dan: October 23, 2014

References

External links
ShogiHub: Professional Player Info · Tanaka, Yuichi

Japanese shogi players
Living people
Professional shogi players
Rikkyo University alumni
Professional shogi players from Nagano Prefecture
1985 births
People from Nagano (city)